Mağusa Sub-district is a sub-district of Gazimağusa District, Northern Cyprus.

References 

Gazimağusa District